The year 1921 in archaeology involved some significant events.

Explorations
Peking Man Site at Zhoukoudian, China is discovered by Swedish geologist Johan Gunnar Andersson and American palaeontologist Walter W. Granger.

Excavations
 Peking Man Site at Zhoukoudian, China is first excavated by Austrian palaeontologist Otto Zdansky.
 Excavations at Beit She'an by the University of Pennsylvania begin (continue to 1933).
 Daya Ram Sahni starts excavations at Harrappa for the Archaeological Survey of India.
 Georgios Sotiriou starts excavations at the church of Agios Gregorios Theologue in Thebes, Greece.

Finds
 Material unearthed by Otto Zdansky's excavations at Peking Man Site in Zhoukoudian, China which will eventually yield two human molars; but these finds will not be announced until 1926.
 Edward Thurlow Leeds discovers an early settlement site of the Anglo-Saxons at Sutton Courtenay, the first in England to be systematically excavated.
 Hjortspring boat.
 Pernik sword is discovered.

Institutions
 Origin of Museum of Anatolian Civilizations in Ankara, Republic of Turkey.

Publications
 January - Society of Antiquaries of London begins publication of The Antiquaries Journal.

Births
 March 11 - Philip Rahtz, English archaeologist (d. 2011)
 May 2 - B. B. Lal, Indian archaeologist (d. 2022)

Deaths
 November 4 - Oscar Montelius, Swedish archaeologist (b. 1843)

References

Archaeology
Archaeology
Archaeology by year